Jupiter and Callisto or The Nymph Callisto Seduced by Jupiter in the Guise of Diana is a 1759 oil painting on canvas by François Boucher, now in the Nelson-Atkins Museum of Art in Kansas City, United States.

It shows Jupiter seducing Callisto whilst disguised as Diana.

References

1759 paintings
Mythological paintings by François Boucher
Nude art
Paintings in the collection of the Nelson-Atkins Museum of Art
Paintings of Jupiter (mythology)